Patterson is a city in St. Mary Parish, Louisiana, United States. The population was 6,112 at the 2010 census. It is part of the Morgan City Micropolitan Statistical Area.

History
During the early 19th century, a group of Pennsylvania Dutchmen boarded a sailing vessel in New Orleans and ventured into the Bayou Teche. One of them, Hans Knight, decided to settle his family in what is now Patterson. The community was originally called Dutch Settlement, Dutch Prairie, and Dutch Town.

In 1832, Captain John Patterson, a trader from Indiana, settled there. He built a store and became a prominent citizen. The town was renamed Pattersonville after the captain successfully moved the post office to Dutch Settlement.

Pattersonville was incorporated in 1907 as the Town of Patterson.

James "Jimmy" Robert Wedell (March 31, 1900 - June 24, 1934) was a famous 1930s racing pilot and aircraft designer. Wedell broke the world record for land-plane speed in 1933 when he clocked 305.33 m.p.h. in a Wedell-Williams aircraft of his own design.[1] He won the Thompson Trophy air race in the same year. Wedell's company, the Wedell-Williams Air Service Corporation, won 14 "distinguished finishes" (top five) in the Thompson and Bendix Trophy races.[2]

James "Jimmie/Jimmy" Robert Wedell was born in Texas City on March 31, 1900 to Robert and Ida Wedell, who operated a tavern in the town. His brother Walter, born on November 14, 1901, was joined later by sisters, Elizabeth and Mary. With the sudden and premature death of both parents, the brothers were on their own from teen years on. The two brothers were both mechanically inclined, especially working with gasoline engines. Another major interest was aviation and flying.[2]

Wedell left school in the ninth grade to open the Black Star Garage behind the family home. He repaired cars and motorcycles and when the first U.S. Army Air Field was established in Texas City in 1913, he learned to fly, and he later taught his brother.[2]

After buying two junked aircraft, the Wedell brothers constructed a new aircraft from the parts and began to fly as exhibition pilots, barnstorming along the Gulf Coast.[3]

During World War I, his brother enlisted in the Navy but Wedell was turned down because of poor eyesight, having lost sight in one eye in a motorcycle accident. After flying in Mexico and the Gulf Coast, the Army hired Jimmy as a civilian instructor of cadet fliers.[4]

After the war, Wedell returned to the Black Star Garage, working as a mechanic, while designing and building racing planes and barnstorming the country. In 1922, the Wedell brothers left for New Orleans where they started an air service and a flying school. They met millionaire Harry P. Williams from Patterson, Louisiana.[2] Williams was in the oil, sugar and lumber businesses and was married to Marguerite Clark, a former star of silent movies.[4] Wedell taught Williams how to fly and they became the best of friends, bonded by their interest in aviation.[5]

Together, they created the Wedell-Williams Air Service Corporation in Patterson with the first enterprise being a passenger service from New Orleans to Houston, Louisiana's first commercial airline. The company also started their own postal air service and opened a flying school. Continuing his earlier work as a designer, Wedell had a factory built to design and build low-wing monoplanes, starting with the Wedell-Williams Model 22.[2]  Patterson is still currently served by the Harry P. Williams Memorial Airport, a general aviation airfield located near the U.S. 90 (future Interstate 49) highway.  

(L–R) Jimmy Doolittle, Jimmy Wedell, and Harry Williams. c. 1933

The “44” (Wedell-Williams Model 44) became one of the fastest aircraft flying in the United States, Wedell called it, "hot as a .44 and twice as fast."[2] During his lifetime, Wedell held more speed and long-distance records than any other racing pilot. Not only the first to fly at over 300 mph in a "land plane", he also set a “three flags speed” mark, flying from Ottawa, Canada to Washington, and on to Mexico City in 11 hours, 53 minutes.[2] Wedell's best year in air racing was in 1933, when he won races at every competition he entered.[6]

In 1934, Wedell was involved in not only air racing but also exhibition flying and even flight training. During flight training, he was killed in an accident on June 24, 1934.

Wedell's death received national attention where he was remembered for his love of speed, his innovations in the design of racing planes, and his reputation for "donating his time and talents to those in need".[7] His obituaries included a column by Will Rogers and an article in Time magazine.[8] Wedell is buried in the Columbia Cemetery in West Columbia, Texas.

Geography
Patterson is located at  (29.692466, -91.306569).

Demographics

2020 census

As of the 2020 United States census, there were 5,931 people, 2,217 households, and 1,235 families residing in the city.

2010 census
As of the census of 2010, there were 6,112 people residing in 2,291 households within the city of which 1,581 households were family units. 65.5% of all households were owner-occupied. The racial makeup of the city was 51.9% White, 44.3% African American, 0.7% Native American, 0.6% Asian and 1.5% from two or more races. Hispanic or Latino of any race were 3.0% of the population.

There were 2,291 households, out of which 33.1% had children under the age of 18 living with them, 44.0% were married couples living together, 18.7% had a female householder with no husband present, and 31.0% were non-families. 27.0% of all households were made up of individuals living alone, and 7.7% were someone living alone who was 65 years of age or older. The average household size was 2.61 and the average family size was 3.16. In the city 27.0% of people were under the age of 18 and 11.5% were 65 years of age or older. The median age was 33.1 years. For every 100 females, there were 92.3 males.

The median income for a household in the city was $48,706, and the median income for a family was $54,066. The median personal income was $27,417. Males had a median income of $47,687 versus $14,118 for females. The per capita income for the city was $20,756. About 15.9% of families and 21.1% of the population were below the poverty line, including 29.1% of those under age 18 and 11.5% of those age 65 or over. In the city, 74.1% had graduated from high school, 10.5% had attained bachelor's degree or higher and 3.5% had attained a graduate or professional degree.

Government
Patterson uses a city council consisting of five council members. As of February 2020, the current mayor of Patterson is Rodney A. Grogan.

Education
It is served by the St. Mary Parish School Board. Schools in Patterson include Hattie A. Watts Elementary School, Patterson Junior High School, and Patterson High School.

Sports
Patterson has always been a dominant football team in the state of Louisiana, producing a couple of NFL players and many Division I college players. Though Patterson has only been to the championship twice, it is a traditional playoff team. Currently led by Head Coach Tommy Minton, the team has been more dominant recently. Patterson is also the home of LSU and New Orleans Saints running back Dalton Hilliard (in Saints Hall of Fame) and Tampa Bay Buccaneers wide receiver Ike Hilliard.

On January 15, 2009, Kenny Hilliard was named ESPN RISE Sophomore Player of the Year.

Notable people
 Ralph Norman Bauer, Speaker of the Louisiana House of Representatives from 1940 to 1948, was born in Patterson in 1899 
 Dalton Hilliard, running back for the New Orleans Saints
 Ike Hilliard, wide receiver for the Tampa Bay Buccaneers
 Gillis Wilson, defensive end for the Carolina Panthers

References

External links
City of Patterson official website

Cities in Louisiana
Cities in St. Mary Parish, Louisiana
Populated places established in 1832